Saccharopolyspora erythraea is a species of actinomycete bacteria within the genus Saccharopolyspora.

Saccharopolyspora erythraea produces the macrolide antibiotic erythromycin. Cytochrome P450 eryF (CYP107A1) originally from the bacterium is responsible for the biosynthesis of the antibiotic by C6-hydroxylation of the macrolide 6-deoxyerythronolide B.

Small non-coding RNAs have been suggested to be involved in regulation of the secondary metabolite  biosynthesis.

References

External links
Type strain of Saccharopolyspora erythraea at BacDive -  the Bacterial Diversity Metadatabase

Pseudonocardineae